Stamnodes marmorata is a species of geometrid moth in the family Geometridae. It is found in North America.

The MONA or Hodges number for Stamnodes marmorata is 7363.

Subspecies
These two subspecies belong to the species Stamnodes marmorata:
 Stamnodes marmorata marmorata
 Stamnodes marmorata odontata Hulst, 1896

References

Further reading

External links

 

Stamnodini
Articles created by Qbugbot
Moths described in 1871